HKBK College of Engineering was established in 1997 and is affiliated to Visvesvaraya Technological University (VTU) and approved by All India Council for Technical Education, New Delhi.

Campus

Location 

The campus is located in the city, opposite to Manyata Tech park at Nagwara, on the north side of Bangalore, Karnataka.
HKBK College of Engineering is spread out on 16 acres of land, opposite to Manyata Tech Park,  Nagavara, Bangalore.

Infrastructure and facilities 
The college has libraries, discussion rooms, large playgrounds, Innovation center and state-of-the-art labs.

Faculty 
The institute has faculty in the core management disciplines and the functional areas of management.

Courses | academic programs | departments 

HKBK contains six academic departments and awards undergraduate, graduate and doctoral degrees in Engineering & Management.

Degree programs 
Engineering - B.E. (Four-year program)
 Computer Science Engineering (CSE)
Information Science Engineering (ISE)
 Electronics and communication Engineering (ECE)
 Mechanical Engineering (ME)
 Civil Engineering (CE)
Artificial Intelligence and machine learning

Masters programs

Master in Business Administration (MBA)

(Dual specialization) 
 Finance
 Human Resource
 Marketing

Postgraduate programs 
Master of Technology (M.Tech)
 Civil Engineering
 Computer Science
 Embedded Systems
 Digital Electronics
 Power Systems

PhD 
Business Studies - PhD-General Management
Basic Sciences - PhD-Physics
Engineering - PhD-Electronics & Communication Engineering
Engineering - PhD-Computer Science Engineering
Engineering - PhD-Civil Engineering
Engineering - PhD-Mechanical Engineering

Campus life

College festivals
The campus hosts festivals. The previous festivals are:
 
CALYPSO: College FEST

College Fest "CALYPSO" gives students the platform to exhibit and polish their expertise in this mega event. Lot of participants will compete to win the heart of crowd. CALYPSO provide a platform to all individuals to showcase their skills and develop their potential via arts, sports, music, dance, drama, debate or fashion.
 
MELAM:

Melam fest which is celebrated annually on the occasion of Onam cultural festival is the ultimate festival of the college. Men and Women wear traditional dress. The Kerala sari or Kasavu sari is particularly wore on this day. The floral carpet, known as Onapookkalam or just Pookkalam, is made out of the gathered blossoms with several varieties of flowers of differing tints pinched up into little pieces to design and decorate patterns on floor. Shingari Melam (Drum Band) is also one of the main attraction. many games like Tug of war are also conducted by the Mallu diaspora present in the college.

College clubs
Arts Club | Auto Club | Technology Club | Fashion Club | Gaming Club | Photography Club | Robotics Club | KAIZEN CLUB

The Auto club has also conceptualised a microlight aircraft, powered by a Yamaha 150cc engine, spanning 17 ft long, with a wingspan of 24 ft, and weighing 100 kg. The craft has been named MAQH13 and is awaiting permission of the Directorate General of Civil Aviation (DGCA) for trials.

References

Engineering colleges in Bangalore
Affiliates of Visvesvaraya Technological University
All India Council for Technical Education
Educational institutions established in 1997
Engineering universities and colleges in India
1997 establishments in Delhi